Menasheh Idafar (born 13 March 1991) is a British-Bahraini racing driver with dual citizenship. In 2010 he competed in the British Formula 3 Championship and won the National Class. Menasheh is part of the small Jewish community of Bahrain. His father is Salman Idafar (a British Jew) and his mother is Houda Nonoo (a Bahraini Jew) who was the first Jew, and third woman, to be appointed ambassador of Bahrain.

References

External links
 Official website
 Career statistics from Driver Database

1991 births
Living people
Bahraini Jews
Bahraini people of Iraqi-Jewish descent
British Jews
British racing drivers
Formula Renault BARC drivers
British Formula Renault 2.0 drivers
British Formula Three Championship drivers
British people of Bahraini descent
British people of Iraqi-Jewish descent
Sportspeople from London

T-Sport drivers
Bahraini racing drivers